Elections to Antrim Borough Council were held on 15 May 1985 on the same day as the other Northern Irish local government elections. The election used three district electoral areas to elect a total of 19 councillors.

Election results

Note: "Votes" are the first preference votes.

Districts summary

|- class="unsortable" align="centre"
!rowspan=2 align="left"|Ward
! % 
!Cllrs
! % 
!Cllrs
! %
!Cllrs
! %
!Cllrs
! % 
!Cllrs
! %
!Cllrs
!rowspan=2|TotalCllrs
|- class="unsortable" align="center"
!colspan=2 bgcolor="" | UUP
!colspan=2 bgcolor="" | DUP
!colspan=2 bgcolor="" | SDLP
!colspan=2 bgcolor="" | Alliance
!colspan=2 bgcolor="" | Sinn Féin
!colspan=2 bgcolor="white"| Others
|-
|align="left"|Antrim North West
|bgcolor="40BFF5"|31.7
|bgcolor="40BFF5"|2
|21.7
|1
|25.8
|1
|2.2
|0
|13.8
|1
|4.8
|0
|5
|-
|align="left"|Antrim South East
|bgcolor="40BFF5"|44.2
|bgcolor="40BFF5"|4
|34.6
|2
|12.6
|1
|8.6
|0
|0.0
|0
|0.0
|0
|7
|-
|align="left"|Antrim Town
|bgcolor="40BFF5"|42.9
|bgcolor="40BFF5"|3
|26.9
|2
|16.2
|1
|12.5
|1
|0.0
|0
|1.5
|0
|7
|-
|- class="unsortable" class="sortbottom" style="background:#C9C9C9"
|align="left"| Total
|39.7
|9
|28.4
|5
|17.8
|3
|7.6
|1
|4.5
|1
|2.0
|0
|19
|-
|}

District results

Antrim North West

1985: 2 x UUP, 1 x SDLP, 1 x DUP, 1 x Sinn Féin

Antrim South East

1985: 4 x UUP, 2 x DUP, 1 x SDLP

Antrim Town

1985: 3 x UUP, 2 x DUP, 1 x SDLP, 1 x Alliance

References

Antrim Borough Council elections
Antrim